Statistics of Swiss Super League in the 1957–58 season.

Overview
It was contested by 14 teams, and BSC Young Boys won the championship.

League standings

Results

Sources
 Switzerland 1957–58 at RSSSF

Swiss Football League seasons
Swiss
1957–58 in Swiss football